The Daily Mirror was an afternoon paper established by Ezra Norton in Sydney, Australia in 1941, gaining a licence from the Minister for Trade and Customs, Eric Harrison, despite wartime paper rationing. 

In October 1958, Norton and his partners sold his newspapers to the Fairfax Group, which immediately sold it to News Limited. It was merged with its morning sister paper The Daily Telegraph on 8 October 1990 to form The Daily Telegraph-Mirror, which in 1996 reverted to The Daily Telegraph, in the process removing the last vestige of the old Daily Mirror.

Frank McGuinness, father of journalist P. P. McGuinness, also played a role in launching the newspaper.

Charles Buttrose, father of Ita Buttrose (launch editor of Cleo, editor of The Australian Women's Weekly and current chair of the ABC), was a journalist on, and then the editor of, The Daily Mirror.

See also 
 List of newspapers in Australia

Notes

Defunct newspapers published in Sydney
News Corp Australia
Publications established in 1941
Publications disestablished in 1990
1941 establishments in Australia
1990 disestablishments in Australia
Daily newspapers published in Australia